Education, Citizenship and Social Justice is a triannual peer-reviewed academic journal covering the field of education as related to social justice. The editors-in-chief are Peter Clough (University of Sheffield), Alan Dyson (University of Newcastle), Tony Gallagher (Queens University, Belfast), and Laurie Johnson (Hofstra University). It was established in 2006 and is published by SAGE Publications.

Abstracting and indexing 
The journal is abstracted and indexed in ERIC, International Bibliography of the Social Sciences, and Scopus.

External links 
 

SAGE Publishing academic journals
English-language journals
Education journals
Social justice
Triannual journals
Publications established in 2006